This article is about the particular significance of the year 1871 to Wales and its people.

Incumbents

Lord Lieutenant of Anglesey – William Owen Stanley 
Lord Lieutenant of Brecknockshire – Charles Morgan, 1st Baron Tredegar
Lord Lieutenant of Caernarvonshire – Edward Douglas-Pennant, 1st Baron Penrhyn 
Lord Lieutenant of Cardiganshire – Edward Pryse
Lord Lieutenant of Carmarthenshire – John Campbell, 2nd Earl Cawdor 
Lord Lieutenant of Denbighshire – Robert Myddelton Biddulph    
Lord Lieutenant of Flintshire – Sir Stephen Glynne, 9th Baronet 
Lord Lieutenant of Glamorgan – Christopher Rice Mansel Talbot 
Lord Lieutenant of Merionethshire – Edward Lloyd-Mostyn, 2nd Baron Mostyn
Lord Lieutenant of Monmouthshire – Henry Somerset, 8th Duke of Beaufort
Lord Lieutenant of Montgomeryshire – Sudeley Hanbury-Tracy, 3rd Baron Sudeley
Lord Lieutenant of Pembrokeshire – William Edwardes, 3rd Baron Kensington
Lord Lieutenant of Radnorshire – John Walsh, 1st Baron Ormathwaite

Bishop of Bangor – James Colquhoun Campbell
Bishop of Llandaff – Alfred Ollivant 
Bishop of St Asaph – Joshua Hughes
Bishop of St Davids – Connop Thirlwall

Events
24 February – In a mining accident at Pentre Colliery, Rhondda, 38 men are killed.
21 March – Welsh-born journalist Henry Morton Stanley sets out for Africa to seek missing Scottish explorer and missionary Dr. David Livingstone.
June – Miners' strike in South Wales culminates in defeat for the union.
14 August – The Van Railway, built by David Davies Llandinam, opens to carry traffic from the Van lead mines to Caersws.
10 November – Stanley locates Livingstone in Ujiji, near Lake Tanganyika, and allegedly greets him saying "Dr. Livingstone, I presume?"
date unknown
Lewis Jones is appointed governor of Chubut Province by the government of Argentina.
Operations at the White Rock smelting works in Swansea are extended by Henry Hussey Vivian to include the treatment of silver and lead ore.

Arts and literature

Awards
Evan Jones (Gurnos) wins a bardic chair at Ystradyfodwg.

New books
W. R. Ambrose – Hynafiaethau, Cofiannau a Hanes Presennol Nant Nantlle, y Traethawd Buddugol yn Eisteddfod Gadeiriol Pen-y-groes
Robert Fowler, MD – A Complete History of the Case of the Welsh Fasting-Girl
James Kenward – Ab Ithel
Thomas Purnell
Dramatists of the Present Day
Correspondence and Works of Charles Lamb

Music
John Thomas (Pencerdd Gwalia) is appointed harpist to Queen Victoria.

Sport
Rugby union – Neath RFC is founded.

Births
5 January – Percy Lloyd, Wales national rugby player (died 1959)
23 February – Jack Evans, Wales national rugby player (died 1924)
2 March – Billy Bancroft, sportsman (died 1959)
28 March – R. Silyn Roberts, Socialist and pacifist writer (died 1930) 
1 April - Dai St. John, heavyweight boxer (died 1899)
6 April – Prince Alexander John of Wales, youngest son of the Prince and Princess of Wales (died 1871)
12 April – Ellis William Davies, politician (died 1939)
15 April – John Humphreys Davies, writer (died 1926)
11 May – George Howells, academic and writer (died 1955) 
6 June – Evan Lloyd, Wales international rugby player (died 1951)
14 June – David Nicholl, rugby player (died 1918)
July - Owen Jones, footballer (died 1955)
2 July – Sir Evan Williams, 1st Baronet, industrialist (died 1959)
3 July – W. H. Davies, poet (died 1940)
13 August – Jack Elliott, Wales international rugby player (died 1938)
21 September – Alfred Brice, Wales international rugby player (died 1938)
1 October – Sir Lewis Lougher, industrialist and politician (died 1955) 
10 October – Thomas Gwynn Jones, poet (died 1949) 
3 November – Owen Badger, Wales national rugby player (died 1939)
27 November – Robert Evans (Cybi), writer (died 1956)
29 November (in England) – Ruth Herbert Lewis, social reformer and collector of Welsh folk songs (died 1946)
1 December – Bert Dauncey, Wales international rugby player (died 1955)
3 December – Sir Percy Emerson Watkins, civil servant (died 1946)
date unknown
William Jenkins, politician (died 1944)
Howard Passadoro, footballer (died 1921)
Thomas Mardy Rees, historian and author (died 1953)

Deaths
19 January – Thomas Jeremy Griffiths, minister, hymn-writer and teacher, about 75
30 January – Edward Howell, US politician of Welsh descent, 78
February – Robert Roberts, musician, 30
23 July – Arthur James Johnes, judge, 62
2 August – David James (Dewi o Ddyfed), writer (born 1803)
6 October – Edwin Wyndham-Quin, 3rd Earl of Dunraven and Mount-Earl, 59

References

 
Wales